Keolis Downer Northern Beaches is a bus operator in Sydney, Australia. A subsidiary of Keolis Downer, it operates services in Sydney Bus Region 8 on the Lower North Shore and Northern Beaches under contract to Transport for NSW. Its headquarters are located at Brookvale Bus Depot.

History
In October 2019, the Government of New South Wales announced that the bus operations of State Transit were to be contracted out to the private sector. In May 2021, Keolis Downer was awarded the contract to operate Sydney Bus Region 8. Keolis Downer Northern Beaches (KDNB) commenced operating on 31 October 2021 with its contract to run for eight years.

Fleet
As of July 2022, the fleet consists of 413 buses operating from three depots.

Keolis Downer Northern Beaches have inherited a fleet of 410 buses from the STA. These include Volvo B12BLE's & B12BLEA's, Volvo B7RLE's, Volvo B8RLE's, Volvo B10BLE's, Scania K310UB's, MAN ND323F's & Iveco Metro's.

The current fleet is located below:

Depots
Keolis Downer Northern Beaches operates three depots: Brookvale(V), Mona Vale(F) and North Sydney(N).

References

Bus companies of New South Wales
Bus transport in Sydney
Keolis
Transport companies established in 2021
Australian companies established in 2021